is a Japanese cycling team established in 2015 based in Gunma Prefecture. It was registered as UCI Continental team in 2015–2016.  It competes mainly in JBCF JProTour league.

Team roster

References

External links
 

UCI Continental Teams (Asia)
Cycling teams established in 2015
Cycling teams based in Japan
Sports teams in Gunma Prefecture
2015 establishments in Japan